Shildon is a railway station serving the town of Shildon in County Durham, England on the Tees Valley Line, between  and  via .

History
The original station was constructed by Timothy Hackworth. It opened on 27 September 1825, under the Stockton and Darlington Railway.

Facilities
Station facilities here have been improved as part of the Tees Valley Metro project. The package for this station included new fully lit waiting shelters, digital CIS displays, renewed station signage and the installation of CCTV. The long-line Public Address system (PA) has been renewed and upgraded with pre-recorded train announcements.

The station is unstaffed and all tickets must be purchased from the ticket vending machine on the platform prior to travel. Step-free access is available to both platforms via ramps, which were added in 2003 when the station was rebuilt in conjunction with the construction of the Shildon Locomotion Museum, sited alongside it on land formerly occupied by the sidings of the Shildon railway works.

Bishop Auckland is the junction with the now privately owned and operated Weardale Railway to Stanhope.

Services

As of the May 2021 timetable change, the station is served by an hourly service between Saltburn and Bishop Auckland via Darlington. All services are operated by Northern Trains.

Rolling stock used: Class 156 Super Sprinter and Class 158 Express Sprinter

References

External links
 
 

Stockton and Darlington Railway
Railway stations in County Durham
DfT Category F1 stations
Former North Eastern Railway (UK) stations
Railway stations in Great Britain opened in 1825
Northern franchise railway stations
Shildon